John Strickler Martin (October 11, 1875 – May 13, 1931) was an Ontario farmer and political figure. He represented Norfolk South and then Norfolk in the Legislative Assembly of Ontario as a Conservative member from 1923 to 1931. Martin was also a teacher, piano and organ merchandiser, famed White Wyandotte chicken farmer, Reeve of Port Dover, and the Grand Master Mason of the Grand Lodge of Canada.

Martin was born in Haldimand County, Ontario (Walpole Township). He was the eldest child of George and Clara (Strickler) Martin and educated in Port Dover and at Toronto University. In 1909, he married Lillian Else. He taught at the local high school for a number of years. Martin was chair for the local Board of Trade and served as reeve for Port Dover from 1922 to 1923. He bred poultry and raised cattle on his farm.

Martin served as Minister of Agriculture for the province from 1923 to 1930. He died in office in 1931.

References

External links 

1875 births
1931 deaths
Members of the Executive Council of Ontario
Progressive Conservative Party of Ontario MPPs